The Scarborough Formation is a geologic formation in England. It is part of the Ravenscar Group, and was deposited in the Bajocian of the Middle Jurassic

References
 

Jurassic England
Bajocian Stage